Avasthi is an Indian surname that may refer to
Abhishek Avasthi (born 1982), Indian actor, choreographer, dancer and model
Aditi Avasthi (born 1981), Indian entrepreneur
Prachee Avasthi (born 1979), American biologist and science communicator 
Swati Avasthi, Indian American writer of fiction 
Vitthal Shankar Avasthi, Indian politician